is a Japanese term meaning "ornament for display; objet d'art; decorative object", typically displayed in a  alcove or  altar.

Etymology 
The Japanese word  compounds  and .. The Oxford English Dictionary defines the loanword  as "A standing ornament or figure, esp. one put in a guest room of a house", and records the first usage in 1886 by William Anderson.

Description 

An  can be made out of wood, ivory, ceramic or metal. 

 are normally not larger than a few centimetres. They depict all sorts of animals, mythological beasts, humans, gods, fruit, vegetables and objects, sometimes combined with each other, in all sorts of positions. Sometimes a scene is portrayed as well, either a daily scene or from a story.  

Some  were inspired by a group of objects and were supposed to be shown together as an ensemble.

History 

During the Meiji period, many  were made for export to the West. One of the most renowned artists in the area of metalwork was Yamada Sōbi (1871-1916), who made pieces out of a single sheet of metal.

References

External links

 Netsuke: masterpieces from the Metropolitan Museum of Art, an exhibition catalog from The Metropolitan Museum of Art (fully available online as PDF), which contains many example 
 English online dictionary definition, related information, and various visual examples

Japanese metalwork
Japanese pottery
Japanese woodwork
Japanese words and phrases